The Istanbul Film Festival is the first and oldest international film festival in Turkey, organised by the Istanbul Foundation for Culture and Arts.  It is held every year in April in movie theaters in Istanbul, Turkey. As mentioned in its regulations, the festival aims to encourage the development of cinema in Turkey and to promote films of quality in the Turkish cinema market.

The 40th edition of the festival was held from April 1 to June 29, 2021 in hybrid format.

History
The Istanbul International Film Festival was first organized in 1982, within the frame of the International Istanbul Festival as a "Film Week" consisting of six films. The theme of the films participating in the Festival was limited to "Arts and Cinema", to keep the event within the context of the International Istanbul Festival. In 1983 the event was realized under the title of "Istanbul Filmdays", taking place throughout the Festival within a span of a month.

Beginning from 1984, the event gained an identity as a separate activity; it was shifted to the month of April. In 1985, two competitive sections, one being national and the other international, were included in the festival program. From 1987 on, "Cinema Honorary Awards" began to be presented.

In the following years, The Istanbul International Filmdays firmly established its position and took its place among the major film festivals of the world with the large number of films shown and the quality and versatility of its program.

At the beginning of 1989 the event was recognized as "a competitive specialized festival" by International Federation of Film Producers Associations (FIAPF) and was accredited. Parallel to this development, "Istanbul Filmdays" was renamed as "Istanbul International Film Festival".

Beginning from 1996, "Lifetime Achievement Awards" along with "Cinema Honorary Awards" began to be presented to international cineastes, actors and actresses. 

In 2006, celebrating its 25th year, the festival created a meeting platform for Turkish and European film professionals under the title "Meetings on the Bridge", aiming to bring European film institutions with Turkish directors and producers to discuss funding possibilities.
Also in 2006, Azize Tan, the then Assistant Director of the festival replaced Hülya Uçansu as director.

In 2007, the Council of Europe, in collaboration with Eurimages, started to present the Film Award of the Council of Europe (FACE) to a film selected from the entries in the Human Rights and Cinema section of the festival. The Council of Europe and later Eurimages support for this award was discontinued in 2020.

With its 28th edition in 2009, the festival began to give its Golden Tulip Award also as a result of its National Competition.

Azize Tan was replaced by the Assistant Director of the festival, Kerem Ayan, in 2015.

Since the beginning of the Festival, a total of 2,065,000 spectators have attended the screenings of 2,330 films from 72 different countries (2005 figures). The festival boasted an audience of 170,000 in 2007, breaking its own record.

Censorship

In 1988, government inspectors forced the withdrawal of 5 of 160 films that are to be screened at the festival. Jean-Jacques Beineix's Betty Blue and Vedreba (The Plea) by Tengiz Abuladze were among these five works. Vedreba was being blocked on the grounds that it was "anti-Islamic" and cuts from the other four films were demanded because of erotic scenes.

Upon the notification by the censorship board that certain films on the program were to be banned, the then president of the Golden Tulip Jury, Elia Kazan, organised a protest march with the participation of Turkish filmmakers. The Turkish Ministry of Culture subsequently issued a decree holding all international film festivals exempt from censorship.

Program

The selection and programming  of the festival films is conducted by the selection committee and the advisory board. The program consists of an international competition open only to feature and animated films on art and artists or literary adaptations, a national competition, non-competitive, informative sections on specific themes which can include documentaries, shorts and feature films.

The 2008 program which includes 200 films comprises the following sections:
International Competition
Turkish Cinema 2007-8
National Competition
Out of Competition
Documentaries
Festival Awards Screenings
Special Screening: Turkish Classics Revisited
Human Rights in Cinema
Galas
Challenging the Years
From the World of Festivals
Young Masters
Documentary Time with NTV
American Independents
Mined Zone
Midnight Madness
Woman is Her Name
From the Caucasus to the Mediterranean
Medscreen Arab Film Promotion
Kids' Menu
The World of Animation: Alexander Petrov
'68 and its Heritage
Marc Caro: Lost in Illusions
In Memoriam
Nokia Nseries Short Film Competition

Awards list

These awards are presented within the context of the festival:
Golden Tulip (for the best film in the international competition)
Best Turkish Film of the Year
Best Turkish Director of the Year
Special Prize of the Jury
Special Mention
Best Actor and Best Actress (national competition)
Honorary Award
Lifetime Achievement Award
FIPRESCI Prize (national -in memory of Onat Kutlar- and international competitions)
 Human Rights in Cinema Award (previously Film Award of the Council of Europe)
People's Choice Award

Golden Tulip winners

Other awards

National Competition Awards of the 28th International Istanbul Film Festival , retrieved 2009-07-23

Famous visitors
Famous visitors since 1982 include:
Actors and actresses

Directors

References

External links
Official Festival Website

Recurring events established in 1982
Film festivals in Turkey
Festivals in Istanbul
Annual events in Turkey
1984 establishments in Turkey
Spring (season) events in Turkey